Summer in Baden-Baden (Лето в Бадене) is a book by a Soviet Jewish writer Leonid Tsypkin about the Russian writer Fyodor Dostoevsky, especially his visit to the German resort Baden-Baden.

It was written in the period from 1977 to 1981, but published in English in 2001 nearly 20 years after his death with a preface by Susan Sontag.

It was first published in a Russian emigrant magazine in USA in March 1982, a week before his death.

References

External links
New York Times review, March 3, 2002
 Online text in Russian Summer in Baden-Baden «Лето в Бадене»

2001 novels
Soviet novels
Works about Fyodor Dostoyevsky
Baden-Württemberg in fiction